Charlie Tyrell (born 1988) is a Canadian film director. He is most noted for his short documentary film My Dead Dad's Porno Tapes, which won the Canadian Screen Award for Best Short Documentary at the 7th Canadian Screen Awards.

Early life and education

Born and raised in Hamilton, Ontario, Tyrell studied film at Ryerson University.

Career

In addition to narrative and documentary short films, he has directed music videos for Harrison, The Precious Lo's, Keita Juma and McCallaman.

References

External links
Official website

Charlie Tyrell at Instagram

1988 births
Canadian documentary film directors
Canadian music video directors
Directors of Genie and Canadian Screen Award winners for Best Short Documentary Film
Film directors from Ontario
Toronto Metropolitan University alumni
People from Hamilton, Ontario
Living people